The Mahindra e2o Plus was a 5-door, 4-seater electric city car produced between 2016 and 2019 by Mahindra Electric for the Indian market. Its front fascia styling was similar to that of its smaller predecessor, the Mahindra e2o. Unlike its predecessor, it was not sold in the United Kingdom.

Company history

Comparison of specifications

Production 
The e2o Plus was launched on 21 October 2016 at a price ranging between INR 5.46 lakh and INR 8.46 lakh in Delhi (ex-showroom, after subsidies and incentives). It was one of the cheapest 4-door electric cars in the world, and one of the cheapest 4-door cars with an automatic gearbox (technically, it had no conventional gearbox.)

Initially, it was offered in 4 different trims: P2, P4, P6 and P8. The first three variants had a 19 kW motor powered by a 48V battery pack. The P8 variant had a 30 kW motor powered by a 72V battery pack. According to the manufacturer, the top variant was able to accelerate from 0 to 60 mph in 9.5 seconds.

At the Auto Expo 2018, the manufacturer revealed a version of the e2o Plus with a different front styling and more "premium" interior, named e2o NXT, although given the lack of available photos of this version, except the ones taken at the Auto Expo or shown in promotional materials, it is possible this version never made it into production.

The last e2o Plus rolled off the assembly line on 31 March 2019, although as of May 2019 the vehicle is still available for sale in India. New, more stringent safety rules were mentioned as one of the reasons for discontinuation. Mahindra continues to offer at least one other electric car, the eVerito.

Fleet use 
The e2o Plus is used by the all-electric cab service providers in Bangalore, Delhi and other cities.

The ride-hailing company Ola Cabs introduced 100 of these cars in Nagpur in 2017.

The e2o Plus is, or was, used by the car rental company Zoomcar in Bangalore, Delhi, Hyderabad, Mysore and Pune

See also 
 REVAi

References

External links

Cars of India
Production electric cars
Electric city cars
Cars introduced in 2016